Kevin Czuczman (born January 9, 1991) is a Canadian professional ice hockey defenceman. He is currently playing with Ilves in the Liiga.

Playing career
Undrafted, Czuczman attended Lake Superior State University where he played three seasons with the Lake Superior State Lakers men's ice hockey team from 2011 to 2014. He scored his first collegiate goal on November 4, 2011 against Bemidji State. In 2013–14, Czuczman was named to the All-WCHA Second Team.

On March 11, 2014, the New York Islanders signed Czuczman as a free agent to a two-year, entry-level deal, and he made his NHL debut one week later, on March 18, 2014, playing just over 20 minutes in a 6–0 loss to the visiting Minnesota Wild.

At the conclusion of his entry-level contract with the Islanders following the 2015–16 season, Czuczman's rights were not retained by the Islanders, releasing him to free agency. He agreed to a one-year deal to continue in the AHL with the Manitoba Moose, an affiliate to the Winnipeg Jets during the free agency season. With the Moose, Czuczman established himself early to maintain a regular top four role on the blueline for the 2016–17 season. Improving his offensive output and becoming an alternate captain, Czuczman responded with his best professional season in compiling 9 goals and 32 points in 76 games.

On July 3, 2017, Czuczman back in the interest of NHL clubs, agreed to a one-year, two-way contract with the Pittsburgh Penguins. On June 25, 2018, Czuczman re-signed with Pittsburgh on a one-year, two-way contract. On June 26, 2019, Czuczman re-signed with Pittsburgh on two-year contract.

Leaving the Penguins after four seasons within the organization, Czuczman was signed by the Minnesota Wild to a one-year, two-way contract on July 29, 2021.

Having played exclusively in North America for the first nine seasons of his professional career, Czuczman signed his first contract abroad in agreeing to a one-year contract with Finnish club, Ilves of the Liiga, on June 23, 2022.

Career statistics

Awards and honors

References

External links 
 

1991 births
Living people
Bridgeport Sound Tigers players
Canadian ice hockey defencemen
Florida Everblades players
Ice hockey people from Ontario
Ilves players
Iowa Wild players
Lake Superior State Lakers men's ice hockey players
Manitoba Moose players
New York Islanders players
People from Bruce County
Pittsburgh Penguins players
Undrafted National Hockey League players
Wilkes-Barre/Scranton Penguins players